"For Crying Out Loud" is a song written by Jimmy Compton and Phil Wood, produced by Ron Haffkine, and recorded by American country music artist Davis Daniel. It was released in August 1991 as the second single from his album Fighting Fire with Fire. The song reached No. 13 on the Billboard Hot Country Singles & Tracks chart in November 1991.

Chart performance

References

1991 singles
1991 songs
Davis Daniel songs
Song recordings produced by Ron Haffkine
Mercury Records singles